The Grand Opera House is a theatre in York, England.  It is located on Clifford Street and Cumberland Street in the city centre.

The theatre is operated as part of the Ambassador Theatre Group. It plays host to touring productions of plays, musicals, opera and ballet, one-off performances by comedians, and other theatrical and musical events. The theatre has been designated a Grade II listed building by English Heritage.

Origins 

The Grand Opera House was not built as a theatre. It was a conversion of two buildings, one a warehouse, the other a corn exchange designed by G. A. Dean in 1868. The architect, Mr J. P. Briggs of London, was commissioned to perform the conversion, which took three months and cost £24,000. The theatre opened as the Grand Theatre and Opera House on 20 January 1902 with a performance of a pantomime (Little Red Riding Hood), starring Florrie Forde.

History 

  17 July 1902: the first public performances of films in York. Professor Herbert's animated pictures displayed in his 'Biograph Box'. The showing of films at the venue became a permanent feature from 1903-1916.
  1903: the theatre was renamed as the Opera House and Empire Theatre. This was an economic move to attract a mass audience, as smoking was not permitted in high-class theatres but was in music hall type venues; smoking was very fashionable at this time.
  1909: a major redecoration of the building was undertaken.
  1916: the theatre was now known as the Empire Theatre.
 1956: closed "... by the crippling Entertainment Tax."
  1958: Ernest Shepherd of the Shambles bought the theatre, now called the S. S. Empire [Shepherd of Shambles]. The stage and the rake to the stalls floor were removed to give a level surface for roller skating, bingo and wrestling bouts. The theatre remained in this configuration until 1985 when it closed for business.
  1987: the property was purchased by the India Pru Company Ltd. who renovated the building and restored the decor to its 1909 Art Nouveau style. 
 26 September 1989: the theatre reopened as the Grand Opera House with a performance of Macbeth. After two years with mounting debts the theatre suddenly closed without warning.
  26 February 1993: the theatre reopened again, retaining the name of the Grand Opera House.
  3 November 2009: the theatre is acquired by Ambassador Theatre Group as part of the Live Nation Deal

References 
Notes

Sources

External links

Theatres Trust description
York History description

1902 establishments in England
Commercial buildings completed in 1868
Grade II listed buildings in York
Grade II listed theatres
Theatres in York
Art Nouveau architecture in England